is a district in Tokyo, which has many historical structures, in the style of Edo-period Tokyo. It is known for its traditional style and antiquated temple district-style.

The three neighbourhoods, Yanaka(谷中), Nezu(根津) and Sendagi(千駄木) are collectively called Yanesen: Ya-Ne-Sen.

References

External links 
TIME: 10 Reasons to Visit Yanesen
Yanesen — Shitamachi off the Beaten Path (Hiragana Times)
Yanesen group of Flickr

Neighborhoods of Tokyo